Alex Borg  (born 10 July 1995) is a lawyer and Maltese Member of Parliament. In April 2022, he was appointed shadow minister for Gozo.

Early life 
Borg was born in Victoria, Gozo. He is the son of Mary Debono Borg and Tony Borg, who served as chief of staff to former Minister for Gozo Giovanna Debono.

He completed his legal studies at the University of Malta and has been a practicing lawyer since 2019.

Political life 
In November 2020, Borg was elected to the MZPN's executive committee, to serve as Gozo Coordinator in the MZPN's executive committee.

In July 2021, Borg was elected as a member of the Nationalist Party's Executive Committee.

Borg was elected to the House of Representatives in March 2022.

Electoral record 
Borg ran on the 13th District during the 2022 Maltese General Election. He obtained 6,108 first preference votes, beating some incumbent and high-ranking politicians in his own party and getting the highest number of first preference votes across all the districts after Party Leader Bernard Grech.

Controversies

Repubblika 
In August 2021, local NGO Repubblika demanded an apology from Borg. The incident followed a different NGO asking social media users whether they would rather see Borg's Nationalist Party replaced by a new political party. In a Facebook post, Borg "strongly condemned" both non-governmental organisations and "completely disassociated" himself "from entities like these, whose main goal goes beyond the principles and values of our glorious party."

The "attack" spurred Repubblika president Robert Aquilina to warn of "fascist sentiments" and demanded an immediate apology. To date, none has been forthcoming.

Leadership 
In April 2022, a Malta Today survey found that around 70% of PN councillors want Grech to remain as leader. Borg was mentioned as an alternative candidate, as well as Franco Debono, Joe Giglio, Roberta Metsola, and Adrian Delia. Borg stated that he will not run for PN leader at that moment, but does not rule out a future bid.

During an edition of TVM’s Ħadt l-Aħbar, one of Malta’s most renowned political pundits, architect Robert Musumeci, has endorsed Borg as a future leader of the Nationalist Party.

Personal life 
Borg was raised in Nadur, Gozo and is currently living in Fontana, Gozo. He received his primary education at the Bishop's Conservatory School, secondary education at the Gozo College Secondary School, and attended sixth form at Sir M. A. Refalo in Victoria, Gozo.

Borg is a model and in 2020 won the Mr World Malta title.

References 

1995 births
Maltese politicians
Living people